No Trespassing (lit. "One does not pass through here") is a 1975 Romanian historical drama directed by Doru Năstase and written by Titus Popovici. It follows the events around the Battle of Păuliș, fought during World War II.

The film is known in English as No Trespassing!, a mistranslation of the title, which actually refers to a popular phrase used in a staunch military defense.

Plot 

The film opens just before King Michael's Coup of August 1944, at the Reserve Infantry NCOs School of Radna. Students are regularly harassed and abused by the German officers present, in particularly the SS officer Reinhardt (Motoi). When the coup occurs, the students turn against the Germans and arrest most of them, with Reinhardt fleeing in the night. As the nearby town of Păuliș celebrates, Axis planes bomb the village, prompting many of the villagers to plan to leave. The students receive word that the Hungarians, with German support (including Reinhardt, who alerts them about the weakness of the cadets), are launching an invasion force. The school is given the order to delay the approaching enemy, or die in the attempt. During these events, the film follows the stories of a handful of characters: Andrei (Rădescu), who finds himself in conflict with his peers; Colonel Maxineanu (Stănculescu), the school commander; and Adrian (Mavrodineanu), a young villager who is inspired by the bravery of the cadets.

The Hungarians arrive and launch a series of attacks against the Romanians. The Axis forces are pushed back again and again, despite superior numbers and weaponry. At the end of the film, they launch one last attack, which seems to be a breakthrough. Just at that moment, reinforcements from the Soviet and Romanian armies arrive, pushing the Hungarians back.

Cast 

 Silviu Stănculescu as Colonel Maxineanu
 Vlad Rădescu as Andrei
  as Ada
 Vladimir Găitan as Petru
 George Motoi as Reinhardt
  as Sergeant Toma
 Victor Mavrodineanu as Adrian
  as Mama
 Cornel Coman as Lieutenant Ionescu
 Sorin Lepa as Medicul
  as Nicolae
  as Sică
 Ilarion Ciobanu as Ilarie
 
 Ferenc Fabian as the Gendearme
 Constantin Dinulescu as the Doctor
 Emil Liptac as Avram 
 
 Dorin Varga	
 	
 Mihai Cafrița	
  as a German officer
 Ladislau Miske as a Hungarian officer
 Karoly Sinka
 Constantin Lungeanu
 Papil Panduru	
 Nicolae Pomoje	
 	
 Constantin Branea

References

External links 

 Pe aici nu se trece at the Internet Movie Database

Romanian historical drama films
1970s Romanian-language films